The Cobbler is a Scottish mountain

The Cobbler may also refer to:

 The Cobbler (1923 film), an Our Gang short subject comedy
 The Cobbler (2014 film), an American comedy-drama film

See also
 Cobbler (disambiguation)